Yager is a combat flight simulation video game developed by Yager Development and published by THQ, Kemco, and DreamCatcher Interactive. It was first released as an Xbox exclusive before later being ported to Microsoft Windows, both in 2003. The Xbox version was released in North America in later 2004, while the PC version was released in North America as Aerial Strike: Low Altitude - High Stakes: The Yager Missions in February 2005. In this game, gamers take on the role of Magnus Tide, a freelance pilot adventurer. Yager and Aerial Strike is set over 20 levels in which the player takes possession of various weapons and ships in an effort to accomplish each mission. The game, while well-received critically, was not a commercial success, largely in part due to a delayed North American release amidst a lack of advertising.

Gameplay
Yager is set in a futuristic world where countries borders no longer exist and the earth is controlled by a number of mega corporations, most notably DST, as well as Proteus and Lobos Robotics. Although the old countries officially do not exist there are tell tale signs identifying each environment.

The Proteus Islands are a tropical paradise and the headquarters of the Proteus Corporation. The Free Trade Zone, a landscape dotted with turbines and palm trees, is the only zone not controlled by any corporation. The DST zone and surrounding fjords are connected to the Free Trade Zone by a system of caves, rivers, and deltas that run deep into DST territory. Bitterfeld is a desolate area littered with disused industrial buildings, crashed ships, abandoned machinery and other debris left behind by the old Progress Company.

Reception

Yager and Aerial Strike received "mixed or average reviews" according to the review aggregation website Metacritic.

References

External links
 

2003 video games
Combat flight simulators
DreamCatcher Interactive games
Kemco games
THQ games
Video games developed in Germany
Windows games
Xbox games
Yager Development games